Henri Vialmonteil (2 April 1892 – 16 January 1937) was a French footballer. He played in six matches for the France national football team from 1911 to 1913. He was also named in France's squad for the football tournament at the 1912 Summer Olympics, but the French side withdrew from the competition.

References

External links
 

1892 births
1937 deaths
French footballers
France international footballers
Place of birth missing
Association football wingers